Franz Streitt, or Franciszek Streitt (24 November 1839 – 29 December 1890) was a Polish-born German painter.

Family 
His father was a tax collector.

Education 
He graduated from the Realschule in Lviv, followed by studies at the Technical University. From 1856 to 1866, he studied at the Academy of Fine Arts in Kraków with Władysław Łuszczkiewicz and Jan Matejko. He completed his studies at the Academy of Fine Arts Vienna, with Eduard von Engerth, graduating in 1871.

Later life 
He initially settled in Cracow and painted historical scenes, inspired by his mentor, Matejko.

He was only there briefly, however, before moving to Munich, where he and Antoni Kozakiewicz opened a joint studio. Together, they formed a group of expatriate Polish artists that included Józef Brandt and Alfred Kowalski. He also became a member of the Kunstverein München. Later, he took several study trips to Galicia and Hungary.

Over time, he switched from historical painting to genre scenes, from the lives of farmers and Gypsies. His works may be seen in collections in Germany, Austria, England and the United States. Some of his works appeared as illustrations in Die Gartenlaube of Leipzig.

In 1881, he married the painter, Maria Theresia Friedl (1855-1908).

Sources 
 Biography from the Biographisches Lexikon des Kaiserthums Oesterreich @ WikiSource

External links 

 More works by Streitt @ ArtNet

1839 births
1890 deaths
19th-century German painters
19th-century Polish painters
19th-century German male artists
German genre painters
Polish emigrants to Germany
People from Brody